Floriano Peixoto Vieira Neto (born 22 May 1954) is a retired Divisional General of the Brazilian Army and former commander of the United Nations Stabilization Mission in Haiti (MINUSTAH). Born in Minas Gerais, he is a graduate of the Agulhas Negras Military Academy and has served as commander of three different army battalions and also as liaison officer of the Brazilian Army and instructor at the United States Military Academy at West Point, New York. From April 2009 to April 2010, Div. Gen. Floriano Peixoto was the commander of MINUSTAH, under mandate of the United Nations Security Council.

He assumed the position of Chief Minister of the General Secretariat of the Presidency of the Republic of Brazil, replacing Gustavo Bebianno. Later, he was transferred to the Brazilian Company of Post Offices and Telegraphs (Correios), replacing General Juarez Cunha, and was replaced in the Secretariat-General by the Sub-Chief of Legal Affairs for the Chief of Staff, Jorge de Oliveira Francisco.

References

External links

Official biography at the United Nations

|-

|-

1954 births
Brazilian generals
United Nations military personnel
Living people
People from Minas Gerais